The 2014 Mid-American Conference baseball tournament was held from May 21 through 24.  The top eight regular season finishers of the league's twelve teams, regardless of division, met in the double-elimination tournament held at All Pro Freight Stadium in Avon, Ohio.  Kent State won the tournament, earning the conference's automatic bid to the 2014 NCAA Division I baseball tournament.

Seeding and format
Seeding in the eight-team field is determined by conference winning percentage, regardless of division.  Teams play a two bracket, double-elimination tournament leading to a single elimination final.

Results

* - Indicates game required extra innings.

All-Tournament Team
The following players were named to the All-Tournament Team. Kent State's Cody Koch, one of five Golden Flashes selected, was named Most Valuable Player.

References

Tournament
Mid-American Conference Baseball Tournament
Mid-American Conference baseball tournament
Mid-American Conference baseball tournament